Festuca densipaniculata is a species of grass. It is found only in Ecuador.

References

densipaniculata
Endemic flora of Ecuador
Endangered plants
Taxonomy articles created by Polbot